Amphimallon pseudomajale is a species of beetle in the Melolonthinae subfamily that can be found in Italy and on the island of Sicily.

References

Beetles described in 1976
pseudomajale
Beetles of Europe